John Kokinai (17 May 1951 – 26 September 1992) was a Papua New Guinean long-distance runner. He competed in the marathon at the 1976 Summer Olympics.

References

External links

1951 births
1992 deaths
People from the Autonomous Region of Bougainville
Athletes (track and field) at the 1976 Summer Olympics
Papua New Guinean male long-distance runners
Papua New Guinean male marathon runners
Olympic athletes of Papua New Guinea